"" ("The Solution") is a famous satirical German poem by Bertolt Brecht about the East German uprising of 1953. Written in mid-1953, it is critical of the government and was not published at the time. It was first published in 1959 in the West German newspaper Die Welt.

Text

References

External links

Works by Bertolt Brecht
1953 poems
German poems